Allium tenuissimum is an Asian species of wild onion native to Mongolia, Asiatic Russia, Korea, Kazakhstan and China.

Allium tenuissimum produces a cluster of small, narrow bulbs. Scapes are up to 50 cm tall. Leaves are tubular, shorter than the scapes, about 10 mm in diameter. Flowers are white or pink with a narrow red midvein along each of the tepals.

Varieties
 Allium tenuissimum var. nalinicum S.Chen - Inner Mongolia
 Allium tenuissimum var. tenuissimum - most of specific range

formerly included
 Allium tenuissimum var. anisopodium, now called Allium anisopodium 
 Allium tenuissimum f. zimmermannianum, now called Allium anisopodium var. zimmermannianum

References

tenuissimum
Onions
Flora of temperate Asia
Plants described in 1753
Taxa named by Carl Linnaeus